Daniël Jacobus Mienie (born 1 March 1991) is a South African rugby union player for Rovigo in the Top12 in Italy. His regular position is prop.

Career
He came through the  youth system, playing for their Under–19 and Under–21 teams from 2010 to 2012.

Despite having no Currie Cup experience, he was called up to the  squad for the 2013 Super Rugby season following an injury to Tendai Mtawarira.

He joined Kimberley-based side  on a one-year deal for the 2015 season.

He signed a contract to join Bloemfontein-based side  prior to the 2016 season on a two-year contract.

He joined Rovigo in the Top12 in Italy in September 2019 for 2019-2020 season.

References

1991 births
Living people
South African rugby union players
Sharks (rugby union) players
Sharks (Currie Cup) players
Rugby union props
Afrikaner people
People from Polokwane
Rugby union players from Limpopo